Lieutenant Colonel Qazi Altaf Hussain (1920–1999) served in the British Indian Army later taking up a place in the Army of Pakistan. He advanced to various positions of leadership during his military career, serving as lieutenant colonel of the 11 Frontier Force Regiment, commandant of the Zhob Militia in Quetta, Pakistan, and commander of a regiment in the Indo-Pakistani War of 1965. He was forced to retire as a lieutenant colonel, instead of advancing to general, as a result of his short-tempered, frank and outspoken nature.

Early life
Hussain was born into a family whose lineage included a famous Qadi. He was born in Naushera, Soon Valley as the eldest son of Khan Sahib Qazi Zafar Hussain and the grandson of Qazi Mian Muhammad Amjad.   He was the great-great-grandson of Qazi Kalim Ullah, another famous Muslim qadi, and jurist of Naushera in the time of the Mughal emperors. He belonged to the Awan tribe.

After graduating from Government High School in Naushera, Hussain studied at Government College in Faisalabad, Government College Lahore; and later Aligarh Muslim University, from which he graduated.

In 1943, Quaid-i-Azam Muhammed Ali Jinnah came to Faisalabad and held a political rally of the All-India Muslim League in the Dhobi Ghat Grounds, where over 2 million people were in attendance. Hussain's father, Khan Sahib Qazi Zafar Hussain, arranged a cavalry of Muslim students for the political rally.

Army career
Hussain was commissioned in the British Indian Army as a 2nd lieutenant in 1945. Soon after, he joined the 11 Frontier Force Regiment.  He served in World War II as a 2nd lieutenant. He also served under Sir Olaf Caroe, who administered the North-West Frontier Province in a time of political crisis.

In 1947, after the creation of Pakistan, he joined the Pakistani Army. He served as the 873rd ranking senior officer. When he was an infantry officer with Frontier Force Regiment, Hussain served the Pakistani Army in various positions. He served as a captain and a major in the Frontier Force Regiment of the Pakistani Army, and was eventually promoted to lieutenant colonel. He also served in the Indo-Pakistani War of 1965.

Hussain was appointed commandant of Zhob Militia (one of South Asia's oldest military forces, established in 1890) in Quetta.

Later days
Hussain continued to pursue intellectual activities long after his retirement, remaining active well into his seventies. He was an admirer of Lieutenant-General Sir John Bagot Glubb Pasha, and considered him to be one of the finest historians of Islam in the English language. He was also a fan of Sir Syed Ahmed Khan and Ghulam Ahmed Pervez, and (much to the horror of his religious family, tribe, and the people of his area) he used to follow and preach the religious views of these two scholars.

After his retirement, he continued to look after family land, and a stud farm at Hazel Pur, Renala Khurd. The farm had been established by his father. After Pakistani President General Muhammad Zia-ul-Haq declared a martial law government in 1977, government forces confiscated Hussain's stud farm. This was in retaliation for Hussain's advocacy against the injustice of the Military Government and the effects of Okara's large military farms on the area's small landowners and peasants. 

Hussain died in 1999.

See also
 Frontier Force Regiment
 Pakistan Army
 Lieutenant Colonel
 Robert Groves Sandeman
 Sir Olaf Caroe
 Pakistan
 Awan (Pakistan)
 Aligarh Muslim University
 Zhob
 Lieutenant-General Sir John Bagot Glubb Pasha
 Sir Syed Ahmed Khan
 Ghulam Ahmed Pervez
 All-India Muslim League
 Muhammad Ali Jinnah

References

Frontier Force Regiment officers
British Indian Army officers
Government College University, Lahore alumni
Aligarh Muslim University alumni
Military personnel of the Indo-Pakistani War of 1965
Indian Army personnel of World War II
1920 births
1999 deaths